Discotettix selangori is an insect found in Malaysia, belonging to the Tetrigidae family.

References

Insects of Malaysia
Insects described in 2007
Caelifera